The Dong Neng-3 (DN-3/KO09) is a Chinese ballistic missile defense system.

Design 
The system is generally believed to be based on the DF-21 with elements of the SC-19 also incorporated.

The interceptor is hit-to-kill. It can also be used as an anti-satellite weapon.

The Dong Neng-3 is believed to fill much the same role as the SM-3 however it is believed to be much larger.

History 
Testing of the DN-3 has primarily occurred at the Korla Missile Test Complex.

A 2010 midcourse defense test was most likely a test of the DF-3.

In 2015 the DN-3’s anti-satellite capabilities are believed to have been tested.

In February 2018 the DN-3 was tested against a DF-21 based target in space. This test was reported to be a success by the PLA Daily.

See also 
Dong Neng-2
FJ ABM
2007 Chinese anti-satellite missile test

References 

Anti-satellite missiles
Anti-ballistic missiles of the People's Republic of China